Elections to South Cambridgeshire District Council took place on Thursday 4 May 2006, as part of the 2006 United Kingdom local elections. Twenty seats, making up just over one third of South Cambridgeshire District Council, were up for election, with a by-election being held in one ward (Harston and Hauxton). Seats up for election in 2006 were last contested at the 2004 election, when all seats were up for election due to new ward boundaries, and were next contested at the 2010 election. The Conservative Party remained the largest party with an increased number of seats, but the council remained under no overall control.

Summary
At this election, the Conservative Party and the Liberal Democrats were defending eight seats each. Independent councillors were defending in three wards, while Labour were defending in Sawston. The Liberal Democrats lost three seats to the Conservatives in Balsham, Melbourn and Waterbeach, but gained the Shelfords and Stapleford from the Conservatives. In Milton, the incumbent independent councillor ran for re-election as a Liberal Democrat. Other Conservative gains included from Labour in Sawston as well as from an independent in Cottenham. In Histon and Impington however an independent, who had run as a Conservative in 2004, defeated the incumbent Conservative councillor.

Results

Results by ward

References

2006
2006 English local elections
2000s in Cambridgeshire